Greenville Middle/High School is a public secondary school in Greenville, Piscataquis County, Maine, United States. Grades 9–12 have 89 students and plays Class D athletics. In June 2010, it was named one of the top 1,000 high schools in the United States and one of four on the list from Maine. It was ranked 917. Also in 2010, 52% of Greenville students were eligible for free or reduced lunch.

References

External links
 
 Greenville Middle/High School State of Maine profile

Schools in Piscataquis County, Maine
Public high schools in Maine
Public middle schools in Maine